Woodville Historic District may refer to:

Woodville Historic District (Woodville, Mississippi), listed on the NRHP in Mississippi
Woodville Historic District (Lewiston Woodville, North Carolina), listed on the NRHP in North Carolina